Dirceu Vegini (14 April 1952 – 29 September 2018) was a Brazilian Roman Catholic bishop.

Vegini was born in Brazil and was ordained to the priesthood in 1984. He served as titular bishop of Putia in Byzacena and was auxiliary bishop of the Roman Catholic Archdiocese of Curitiba, Brazil from 2006 to 2010. He then was bishop of the Roman Catholic Diocese of Foz do Iguaçu. Brazil, from 2010 until his death.

Notes

1952 births
2018 deaths
21st-century Roman Catholic bishops in Brazil
Roman Catholic bishops of Curitiba
Roman Catholic bishops of Foz do Iguaçu
People from Santa Catarina (state)